Armes may refer to:

People
Armes (surname)
Armes Beaumont (1842–1913), English-born vocalist active in Australia

Places
Armes, Nièvre, commune in France